The Polloe Cemetery (Spanish: Cementerio de Polloe) is in San Sebastián, Gipuzkoa, Spain. Designed by architect José de Goikoa, it was inaugurated in 1878, and the first burial took place on August 12, 1878. Its pantheons have classical compositions made by various artists.

Notable interments 

 Clara Campoamor (1888-1972), politician and feminist best known for her advocacy for women's rights and suffrage during the writing of the Spanish constitution of 1931

Joaquín Satrústegui (1909-1992), lawyer and political monarchist
Gregorio Ordóñez (1958-1995), politician of the People's Party, assassinated by ETA
 Fermín de Lasala y Collado (1832-1918),Duke of Mandas, politician and public minister of transport, senator and ambassador to Paris and London

See also 

 Lists of cemeteries in Spain

References 

San Sebastián
Cemeteries in Spain